Mount Radspinner is a conspicuous ridge-like mountain, 1,785 m, located just east of Mount Freed and Copperstain Ridge in the east part of Bowers Mountains. Named by Advisory Committee on Antarctic Names (US-ACAN) for Captain Frank H. Radspinner, Jr., USA, commanding officer of the helicopter detachment that supported the United States Geological Survey (USGS) Topo East-West party that surveyed this area in 1962–63.

Mountains of Victoria Land
Pennell Coast